Jukkal is a city in the Kamareddy revenue division of Kamareddy district in the Indian state of Telangana.

Demographics 
Telugu is the official language here. Apart from Telugu, Marathi, Kannada and Urdu are also spoken by a minor section of population. Total population of Jukkal Mandal is 45,168 living in 8,250 houses, spread across total 43 villages and 22 panchayats. Males are 23,076 and females are 22,092.

References 

Villages in Nizamabad district